USS Wichita (LCS-13) is a  littoral combat ship of the United States Navy, the third ship named after Wichita, the largest city in Kansas.

Design 
In 2002, the U.S. Navy initiated a program to develop the first of a fleet of littoral combat ships. The Navy initially ordered two monohull ships from Lockheed Martin, which became known as the Freedom-class littoral combat ships after the first ship of the class, . Odd-numbered U.S. Navy littoral combat ships are built using the Freedom-class monohull design, while even-numbered ships are based on a competing design, the trimaran hull  from General Dynamics. The initial order of littoral combat ships involved a total of four ships, including two of the Freedom-class design.  Wichita is the seventh Freedom-class littoral combat ship to be built.

Wichita includes additional stability improvements over the original Freedom design; the stern transom was lengthened and buoyancy tanks were added to the stern to increase weight service and enhance stability. The ship will also feature automated sensors to allow "conditions-based maintenance" and reduce crew overwork and fatigue issues that Freedom had on her first deployment.

Construction and career 

The keel laying ceremony was on 9 February 2015, at Marinette, Wisconsin. Sponsored by Kate Lehrer, wife of Wichita native Jim Lehrer, the ship was christened and launched on 17 September 2016. The naval crest of the ship incorporates elements of the Wichita flag, along with a bison skull and feathers representing the Native American heritage and wheat to reflect the state of Kansas's main crop. She is assigned to Littoral Combat Ship Squadron Two.  The ship was acquired by the US Navy from Lockheed Martin and the Marinette Marine shipyard on 22 August 2018 along with USS Sioux City in a double delivery.

On 4 November 2020, Rear Admiral Don Gabrielson and Brigadier General Phillip Frietze signed the Joint Force Maritime Component Commander Maritime Campaign Support Plan in a ceremony aboard Wichita at Naval Station Mayport, Florida.

On 25 February 2021, the ship together with Sea Knights of Helicopter Sea Combat Squadron (HSC) 22, detachment 8, is underway to support operations in US Southern Command area of responsibility. On 9 April, Wichita and Jamaica Defence Force Coast Guard patrol vessel  sailing formation during a live-fire exercise. Wichita is deployed to the US 4th Fleet of operations to support Joint Interagency Task Force South’s mission, which include counter illicit drug trafficking in the Caribbean and Eastern Pacific.

On 5 May 2022, USS Wichita conducted Maritime Interdiction Exercises with the Dominican Navy. 

Wichita is one of nine Freedom-class ships the US Navy is intending to decommission in the 2023 financial year.

References

External links 

 

Freedom-class littoral combat ships
Lockheed Martin
2016 ships